Steven Dykstra (born December 1, 1962 in Edmonton, Alberta) is a Canadian former professional ice hockey defenceman. He played in the National Hockey League with the Buffalo Sabres, Edmonton Oilers, Pittsburgh Penguins, and Hartford Whalers.

In his NHL career, Dykstra appeared in 217 games. He scored 8 goals and added 32 assists.

In 1988, he played 27 games for Buffalo Sabres before being traded to Edmonton for Scott Metcalfe. He played 15 of the season's last 21 games for Edmonton. Dykstra did receive a 1988 Stanley Cup ring, as he played the required 42 regular-season games, but his name was left off the Cup, because not all 42 games were played with Edmonton.

Career statistics

Regular season and playoffs

External links

1961 births
Living people
Binghamton Whalers players
Buffalo Sabres players
Canadian ice hockey defencemen
Edmonton Oilers players
Flint Generals (IHL) players
Fort Worth Fire players
Hartford Whalers players
Los Angeles Blades players
Maine Mariners players
Pittsburgh Penguins players
Rochester Americans players
San Diego Gulls (IHL) players
Seattle Breakers players
Ice hockey people from Edmonton
Toledo Storm players
Undrafted National Hockey League players